Bahiopsis is a genus of North American flowering plants in the tribe Heliantheae within the family Asteraceae. It is native to the southwestern United States and northwestern Mexico, with several of the species endemic to the Baja California Peninsula (States of Baja California and Baja California Sur).

 Species

References

Heliantheae
Asteraceae genera
Flora of North America